Chuck Hall may refer to:

 Chuck Hall (Florida politician) (1918–1974), inaugural mayor of Metropolitan Dade County (1964–1970), and mayor of Miami Beach (1971–1974)
 Chuck Hall (Oklahoma politician), mayor of Perry, Oklahoma (2007–2013), current member of the Oklahoma Senate from the 20th district (2019–present)